Rubus alter, the Maine dewberry, is a North American species of flowering plant in the rose family. It is native to the states of Maine and New Hampshire in the northeastern United States.

The genetics of Rubus is extremely complex, so that it is difficult to decide on which groups should be recognized as species. There are many rare species with limited ranges such as this. Further study is suggested to clarify the taxonomy.

References

alter
Plants described in 1941
Flora of Maine
Flora of New Hampshire
Flora without expected TNC conservation status